Arunmozhi (also called Napoleon Selvaraj) (born 1951) is an Indian playback singer and well-known flutist. He has sung songs composed by leading Indian film industry music directors, including Ilaiyaraaja, Shankar Ganesh, Deva, S. A. Rajkumar, Viji Manuel, Swararaj, Harris Jayaraj, Sirpy, Vidyasagar, Soundaryan, Karthik Raja, Siva, Masa, Dhina  and Yuvan Shankar Raja. He has also performed in live concerts across the world. He is a part of Ilaiyaraaja's musical troupe, playing flute. Arunmozhi is very familiar with western musical notes, and used to interpret and explain those written by Ilaiyaraaja to other musicians in the group. Introduced by Ilaiyaraaja as a playback singer, Arunmozhi has sung some very popular hit songs.

Early life 
Arunmozhi was born in Thirukandiswaram  village, near Nannilam in Tiruvarur district, Tamil Nadu. Arunmozhi, a self-taught musician, started playing flute at the age of nine, with a flute that was made by him.  After completing his schooling, he was working as a supervisor in a pharmaceuticals company. His attempt to pursue higher education was disturbed when he lost his documents on the way to Chennai for admission. The events happened after that incident took him to the film industry.

Playing flute
After briefly working as flute musician in various amateur orchestras and clubs,  Arunmozhi entered  the film industry in the year 1980. Shankarsm, a Malayalam movie, was the first film in which Arunmozhi played the flute, and the music was composed by Shankar Ganesh. In the beginning, as a freelancer, Arunmozhi was playing flute for the songs composed by different south Indian music directors.  While he was practicing flute in Prasad Studios, Chennai, in November 1984, a major breakthrough in his music career came.  Ilaiyaraaja, who was also composing music in the same studio called Arunmozhi through his personal assistant after hearing his flute. Later Arunmozhi met Ilaiyaraaja, and got his first chance to play flute, along with other flutists, for the song “Vanthal Mahalakshmi” in the movie Uyarndha Ullam, which had  Kamal Haasan, and Ambika in the lead role. After seeing his performance in this song, Ilaiyaraaja asked Arunmozhi to join his orchestra on a regular basis. Arunmozhi, then, joined Ilaiyaraaja’s musical group in December 1984, after completing his commitments with other music directors. For playing flute, Arunmozhi is being considered as an important selection by Ilaiyaraaja.Meanwhile, he played flute for few popular songs including “Malaiyoram Veesum Kaathu” (Paadu Nilave) and “Pallaviye Charanam”  (Oruvar Vaazhum Aalayam).

In December 1984, the song "Ore Murai Un Dharisanam" in the film En Jeevan Paduthu was the first song in which Arunmozhi, as Ilaiyaraaja’s exclusive flutist, played the flute, though this movie was released few years later. The music was composed by Ilaiyaraaja as a flute-based song, and Arumnozhi has continued to play flute in Ilaiyaraaja's songs in the decades since, including in live concerts. Notable works with flute include "Ila Nenje Vaa" (Vanna Vanna Pookkal), "Thalattum Poongkaatru" (Gopura Vasalile), "Valaiosai gala gala" (Sathyaa), and all the songs in the 1991 drama Chinna Thambi.

Singing career
Arunmozhi's debut in playback singing was for the song "Naan Enbathu Nee Allavo Deva Deva" in the film Soora Samhaaram, which had Kamal Haasan, and Nirosha in the lead role. Arunmozhi and K. S. Chithra sang this song. Ilaiyaraaja composed the music. During the recordings of this song, Vaali and Ilaiyaraaja changed his name to Arunmozhi. Ilaiyaraaja is the music director with whom Arunmozhi has rendered most of the songs in his career. Some of Aunmozhi's hit songs include "Punnaivana Poonguyil" (Sevvanthi), "Vaasakari Veppilaiye" (Sirayil Pootha Chinna Malar), "Vennilavukku Vaanatha" (Thalattu Padava), "Velli Kolusu mani" (Pongi Varum Kaveri), "Oththa Roova tharen" (Nattupura Pattu), "Engal Veetil Ella Naalum" (Vaanathaippola), and "Chalakku Chalakku" (Suryavamsam). Arunmozhi has sung in genres such as hymns and choral. He is one of the few singers with good diction in Tamil film music. Arunmozhi also became the staple voice for actor  Parthiban.

Writing lyrics
Arunmozhi wrote all the songs for the film Enakkoru Magan Pirappan and one song for Arasiyal, with Karthik Raja and Vidyasagar composing the music for each film, respectively.

Discography

Singer
According to popular online media musical sources, the discography of Arunmozhi includes,

Lyricist

References

External links
Raaga World of Music Arunmozhi songs
Jiosaavn Arunmozhi songs
Mio Artist Arunmozhi songs

Living people
Tamil playback singers
Tamil musicians
21st-century Indian singers
Tamil singers
Indian male playback singers

1951 births